is the 16th single by Japanese idol girl group SKE48. It was released on December 10, 2014. It debuted in number one on the weekly Oricon Singles Chart and, as of December 22, 2014 (issue date), has sold 386,495 copies. It also reached number two on the Billboard Japan Hot 100.

Due to restrictions from Avex Trax, only a short version is available on SKE48 Official Channel. Full version MV is included only in limited editions, and wasn't released on YouTube.

Track listing

TYPE-A

TYPE-B

TYPE-C

TYPE-D

Theater Edition

Members

12 Gatsu no Kangaroo 
Team S: Rion Azuma, Masana Oya, Ryoha Kitagawa, Haruka Futamura, Jurina Matsui, Ami Miyamae, Sae Miyazawa, Miyuki Watanabe, Suzuran Yamauchi
Team KII: Mina Oba, Akane Takayanagi, Airi Furukawa, Nao Furuhata, Sarina Souda, Nana Yamada
Team E: Tsugumi Iwanaga, Kanon Kimoto, Marika Tani, Sumire Sato, Aya Shibata, Akari Suda, Rena Matsui

Kesenai Honoo 
Team S: Rion Azuma, Asana Inuzuka, Masana Oya, Ryoha Kitagawa, Risako Goto, Mieko Sato, Mai Takeuchi, Natsumi Tanaka, Rika Tsuzuki, Yuka Nakanishi, Yume Noguchi, Haruka Futamura, Jurina Matsui, Chikako Matsumoto, Sae Miyazawa, Ami Miyamae, Miki Yakata, Suzuran Yamauchi, Miyuki Watanabe

DADA Machine Gun 
Team KII: Riho Abiru, Yuki Arai, Anna Ishida, Mikoto Uchiyama, Yuna Ego, Mina Oba, Ruka Kitano, Saki Goudo, Sarina Souda, Yumana Takagi, Natsuki Takatsuka, Akane Takayanagi, Yuzuki Hidaka, Airi Furukawa, Nao Furuhata, Honoka Mizuno, Yukari Yamashita, Nana Yamada, Mizuho Yamada

Seishun Curry Rice 
Team E: Kyoka Isohara, Narumi Ichino, Tsugumi Iwanaga, Madoka Umemoto, Arisa Owaki, Rumi Kato, Kanon Kimoto, Haruka Kumazaki, Kumiko Koishi, Ami Kobayashi, Makiko Saito, Mei Sakai, Sumire Sato, Aya Shibata, Akari Suda, Sana Takatera, Marika Tani, Nao Fukushi, Rena Matsui

Ai no Rule 
Team KII: Mina Oba, Akane Takayanagi, Airi Furukawa
Team E: Sumire Sato

References 

2014 singles
2014 songs
Avex Trax singles
Japanese-language songs
SKE48 songs
Oricon Weekly number-one singles